The following is a list of notable shopping malls in Bangkok, Thailand:

A

 Amarin Plaza, Ratchaprasong
 Asiatique, Saphan Taksin BTS Station

C

 Central Embassy, Phloenchit
 Central Bangna, Bang Na
 Central Chaengwattana, Pak Kret
 Central Rama 9, Rama IX Road, Ratchadaphisek Road
 Central Ladprao, Lat Phrao Intersection
 Central Pinklao, Barommarat Chachonnani Road, Bangkok Noi
 Central Rama 2, Rama II Road
 Central Ramindra, Raminthra
 Central Rama 3, Rama III Road
 Central Rattanathibet, Rattanathibet Road
 Central WestGate, Nonthaburi
 CentralWorld, Pathum Wan
 Chamchuri Square, Sam Yan

E
 Emporium, Sukhumvit Road
 EmQuartier, Sukhumvit Road
 Esplanade, Thailand Cultural Centre

F
 Fashion Island, Raminthra Road
 Future Park, Rangsit

G

 Gaysorn Plaza, Ratchaprasong

I
 Iconsiam, Khlong San

J
 JJ Mall, Chatuchak

M

 MBK Center, Pathum Wan Intersection

N
 The Nightingale-Olympic, Phra Nakhon

O
 Old Siam Plaza, Phahurat

P

 Pantip Plaza, Pratunam
Paradise Park, Srinakharin Road
 Platinum Fashion Mall, Pratunam

R
 River City Shopping Complex, Bangrak

S

 SCB Park Plaza, Chatuchak
 Seacon Bangkae, Phetkasem Road
 Seacon Square, Srinakharin Road
 Siam Center, Siam Square
 Siam Paragon, Chaloem Phao

T

 Terminal 21, Asok

U
 Union Mall, Lat Phrao Road

Y

Yodpiman Riverwalk, Pak Khlong Talat

See also
 List of shopping malls in Thailand

References

External links
Bangkok.com/shopping-mall/index.html

Shopping malls, Bangkok
Bangkok
Shopping malls